The Culver City Police Department (CCPD) is the police department in Culver City, California.

The  Interim Police Chief is Jason Sims.

History
The Culver City Police Department was founded on November 21, 1917, when the City Trustees provided for the employment of a City Marshal in their 5th resolution. As a result, Frank W. Bradley started work on November 21, 1917. The department did not function as a full-service police department, using the County Jail for prisoners, and having only temporary police officers. Walter Shaw was appointed the first municipal Chief of Police in 1926.

Since the department was formed in 1917, it has had two officers killed in the line of duty, both by traffic accidents. One of the officers from the Rodney King incident, former LAPD officer Timothy Wind was subsequently employed between 1994 and 2000 as one of its community service officers, before leaving California in 2000 for Indiana.

Police Chief
In 2020, Manuel Cid was appointed as the Department’s 26th Police Chief, becoming the youngest and first Latino / Hispanic Police Chief in the Department’s history. Chief Cid announced his resignation as Chief of Police in January 2023.  Assistant Chief Jason Sims will assume the role as acting Chief until a new Chief can be selected.

Fallen Officers
In the over 100 year history of the Culver City Police Department, there has been two police officers that have lost their lives in the line of duty. Sergeant Curtis Massey  was killed in a traffic collision in 2009 and Officer Alonzo H. Garwood in a motorcycle accident while conducting traffic enforcement in 1921.

Specialized Units 
 Bike Patrol
 Drone Pilot
 Narcotics / Vice
 ERT
 K-9
 Special Events
 Motorcycle Enforcement
 Drill Instructor
 Task Force 
 Commercial Enforcement
 Detectives / Investigations
 Jailer
 Reserve Police
 Animal Services
 Parking Enforcement
 Automated Enforcement
 IT

Employee Organization 
The Culver City Police Officers' Association represents officers and sergeants of the Culver City Police Department while the Culver City Police Management Group represents the lieutenants and command officers.

References

External links
 Culver City Police Website

Police department
Municipal police departments of California
Organizations based in Los Angeles County, California
1917 establishments in California